The 2009 British Figure Skating Championships took place from January 11 to 16, 2009 in Nottingham. Skaters competed in the disciplines of men's singles, ladies' singles, pair skating, ice dancing, and synchronized skating across the levels of senior, junior, and novice. The results were among the criteria to determine the British teams for the 2009 World Championships, the 2009 European Championships, and the 2009 World Junior Championships.

Senior results

Men

 WD = Withdrawn

Ladies

Pairs

Ice dancing

Junior results

Men

Ladies

Pairs

Ice dancing

Synchronized

Novice results

Men

Ladies

Pairs

Ice dancing

Synchronized

External links
 

British Figure Skating Championships, 2009
British Figure Skating Championships
Figure Skating Championships